Heather Oliver (born 2 September 1987) was an Australian professional basketball player.

Professional career

College
Oliver played her freshman season and college debut with Central Arizona College. Where she was one of two freshmen to earn NJCCA First Team honours and was named to NJCCA Championship All-Tournament Team. After a successful freshman season, Oliver found herself joining the USC Trojans in NCAA Division I. During her time there, she twice received All-Pac-10 Defensive Honourable Mention.

WNBL
Oliver returned home from college to Victoria and began her professional career in 2010, for the Bendigo Spirit. After two seasons with the Spirit, Oliver took a one-year break from the league. She then returned to the Spirit roster and helped them take home the championship in 2014. Oliver has been re-signed for the 2016–17 season. After seven seasons in the league, Oliver announced her retirement from professional basketball in June 2018.

References

External links
Profile at WNBL

1987 births
Living people
Australian women's basketball players
Guards (basketball)